
Gmina Śniadowo is a rural gmina (administrative district) in Łomża County, Podlaskie Voivodeship, in north-eastern Poland.

Villages
Gmina Śniadowo contains the villages and settlements of Bagno, Brulin, Chomentowo, Dębowo, Doły, Duchny Młode, Grabowo, Jakać Borowa, Jakać Dworna, Jakać Młoda, Jakać-Borki, Jastrząbka Młoda, Jemielite-Wypychy, Kołaczki, Konopki Młode, Koryta, Koziki, Mężenin, Młynik, Olszewo, Osobne, Ratowo-Piotrowo, Sierzputy Zagajne, Sierzputy-Marki, Śniadowo, Śniadowo-Stara Stacja, Stara Jakać, Stara Jastrząbka, Stare Duchny, Stare Jemielite, Stare Konopki, Stare Ratowo, Stare Szabły, Strzeszewo, Szabły Młode, Szczepankowo, Truszki, Uśnik, Uśnik-Dwór, Uśnik-Kolonia, Wierzbowo, Wszerzecz, Wszerzecz-Kolonia, Zagroby, Zalesie-Poczynki, Zalesie-Wypychy, Żebry and Żebry-Kolonia.

Neighbouring gminas
Gmina Śniadowo is bordered by the gminas of Czerwin, Łomża, Miastkowo, Stary Lubotyń, Szumowo, Troszyn and Zambrów.

References

Polish official population figures 2006

Sniadowo
Łomża County